Deorai is a village in Pindra Tehsil of Varanasi district in the Indian state of Uttar Pradesh. Deorai has its own gram panchayat in the same name as the village. The village is about 32 kilometers North-West of Varanasi city, 289 kilometers South-East of state capital Lucknow and 811 kilometers South-East of the national capital Delhi.

Demography
Deorai has a total population of 1,843 people amongst 296 families. Sex ratio of Deorai is 1,078 and child sex ratio is 918. Uttar Pradesh state average for both ratios is 912 and 902 respectively.

Transportation
Deorai can be accessed by road and does not have a railway station of its own. Closest railway station to this village is Khalispur railway station (9.2 kilometers North). Nearest operational airports are Varanasi airport (13.0 kilometers South) and Allahabad Airports (148 kilometers West).

See also

Notes
  All demographic data is based on 2011 Census of India.

References 

Villages in Varanasi district